Murrah High School is a public high school located in Jackson, Mississippi, United States. It is a part of the Jackson Public School District.

History
Prior to desegregation in the 1960s, the school was majority white. Donna Ladd, in an article in the Jackson Free Press, described it as one of several "jewels in the crown of white Jackson back before forced integration—in a time when white conservatives abundantly funded public schools and extracurricular activities with tax money for their own." Jackson schools integrated by law as per Derek Jerome Singleton vs. the Jackson Public School District, decided in 1969.

Demographics
There are 1,600 students enrolled at Murrah High School. The racial makeup of the school is 93.52% African American, 0.59% Asian, 0.44% Hispanic, 0.15% Native American, and 5.30% White.

Name
Murrah High School and Murrah Hall at Millsaps College were named after William Belton Murrah.

William Belton Murrah (1852-1925) was an American bishop in the Methodist Episcopal Church South elected in 1910. Born in Pickensville, Alabama, he was educated at Southern University (now Birmingham-Southern College) in Greensboro, Alabama, and at Centenary College in Jackson, Louisiana. In 1897 Murrah received his LLD from Wofford College in South Carolina. Before his election to the Episcopacy, he served from 1890 to 1910 as the first president of Millsaps College in Jackson. Murrah High School and Murrah Hall at Millsaps College were named after him.

Special programs

Base Pair program
JPS is a partner with the University of Mississippi Medical Center (UMC) in the Base Pair research mentorship program funded by the Howard Hughes Medical Institute. The program matches high school students with UMC faculty members for in-depth experiences in the sciences.

That program, funded since 1992 and continuing through 2015, has brought approximately $1.3 million for science education enhancement into the district. Base Pair-trained high school students are authors on more than five dozen published scientific papers or abstracts. Twenty-five Base Pair graduates are in post-baccalaureate academic programs, including 12 in M.D., M.D./Ph.D., Ph.D. (science), or master's degree in science training. Six of these are currently enrolled in a program at the University of Mississippi Medical Center.

SOAR
The Student Oriented Academic Research (SOAR) program is a companion to the Base Pair program at Murrah High School. SOAR was developed to implement advanced science research activities for JPS students outside of the UMC zone. In this program, students are enrolled in Biology II during their junior year and other advanced life science courses during their senior year. The SOAR program supports advanced biomedical and forensic science laboratory research by students at each high school site.

Forensics
Murrah's Speech and Debate Team, currently coached by Micah Everson, Erin Mauffray, and Javier Peraza, has produced many successful competitors. Murrah students have competed at the National Speech and Debate Tournament each of the last six years.

Academic and Performing Arts Complex (APAC)
The Academic and Performing Arts Complex (APAC) is open to students in grades 4-12 who are academic achievers and/or who show aptitude for one or more of the visual or performing arts. There is an application process held each year for entrance into the programs for the following school year.

Academics: Eligibility for the academics division is based on past grades, standardized tests, entrance tests, and teacher recommendations. Cooperative learning and higher order thinking skills are emphasized. Courses in math, science, language arts, and social studies prepare students to take further APAC and Advanced Placement/APAC classes in high school. APAC academic courses are offered for grades 4-5 at Power APAC Elementary; for grades 68 at Bailey APAC Middle School, and for grades 912 at Murrah High School. In October 2002, Jackson Public Schools received a federal grant totaling almost $1 million to increase the number of middle and high school students who complete college-level courses in high school. This Advanced Placement (AP) Incentive Grant money has been used to increase the number of middle and high school students enrolling in and successfully completing Advanced Placement or college level courses in high school and in pre-AP courses through the district's accelerated academic program (APAC). In APAC, students use skills, textbooks and items above their grade level.
Performing Arts: The performing arts division offers classes in dance, music, theatre arts, and visual arts. Students must apply and audition for entry into the program. These courses are offered for grades 4 through 12 at the Power APAC site. This division of APAC is based on a rigorous written, sequential curriculum taught by artist teachers. Artistically, the objective is to prepare students for the next level in the arts whether university, apprenticeship, or professional experience.

Health Related Professions (HRP)
Murrah High School offers the only health-related professions program in the state of Mississippi for grades 912. The HRP program is an innovative cooperative setting opportunity designed to prepare students in the 21st century and beyond. Its mission is to provide historically under-represented and under-served students with a quality education that will allow them to become articulate in spoken word, masterful in writing, analytical in thought and prepared to enter and complete post-secondary studies in a chosen health career. Students who take health-related professions program at Murrah take a rigorously challenging curriculum that is science-oriented, complemently by advanced math and technology courses. In addition to the academic curriculum, numerous opportunities to narrow-health career choices are provided to students with field trips, mentors from the medical fields, internships, and university partnerships.

Notable alumni

James Barksdale - Time Warner/Netscape executive
Rhesa Barksdale - Federal judge, Fifth Circuit Court of Appeals
LaSondra Barrett - women's basketball
Mike Dennis - football
Hap Farber - football
Curt Ford - baseball
Richard Ford - novelist, Pulitzer Prize
Antonio Gibson - football
Othella Harrington - basketball
Ronnie Henderson - basketball
Beth Henley - Pulitzer Prize–winning playwright
Charlie Hughes - audio engineer, inventor
Lindsey Hunter - basketball
Trey Johnson - basketball
James Robinson - basketball
LaQuinton Ross (born 1991), American basketball player for Hapoel Eilat of the Israeli Basketball Premier League
Nashlie Sephus, computer engineer and entrepreneur
Kathryn Stockett - author of the New York Times Bestseller, "The Help"
Carson Whitsett -  legendary keyboardist, songwriter
Tim Whitsett - music publisher, producer, author
Mo Williams - basketball
Cassandra Wilson - singer

Feeder patterns 
The following schools feed into Murrah High School.

Middle Schools
Chastain Middle School
Bailey APAC Middle School
Elementary Schools
Boyd Elementary School
Casey Elementary School
McLeod Elementary School
McWillie Elementary School
Spann Elementary School
Wells APAC Elementary School

References

External links

Public high schools in Mississippi
Schools in Jackson, Mississippi
Educational institutions established in 1954
1954 establishments in Mississippi